Dhamyal Town is a village of Jhelum District in the Punjab province of Pakistan. Dhamyal Town is approximately less than a mile away from the famous Muhammad of Ghor's tomb.

History
The name Dhamyal Town (Also spelled as Dhamial Town) was taken from the locals' history. Dhamyal is a branch of the well known Rajput tribe which ruled the South Asia for centuries. The village itself was formed in early as 12th century after Muhammad of Ghor invaded and conquered India. The Village has had a few names in the past but most of those were related to Dhamyal or Dhamial which is the name of the Jatt tribe residing within the place.

In 2021, Raja Usman Latif transported soil samples from the vicinity of Dhamyal town to laboratories in the United Kingdom. The analysis of these samples revealed evidence of historical residency in the area dating back 1000 years

The terrain in the vicinity of Dhamyal town was found to be abundant with stones that are typically only found underwater in other regions of the world. Based on this discovery, researchers have postulated that the area was submerged underwater following the latest Ice Age.

Health
Dhamyal Town has its own local hospital which is managed by the Govt of Punjab and has several doctors working in it. The hospital is the centre of health facilities within the suburbs of Dhamyal Town and even other villages around it.

Education
There is a Govt Primary school within the village itself and a girls high school as well as a boys high school within 1-mile radius of the village. Several academics from Dhamyal town are working around the country and globe. Dhamyal town has a literacy rate of 98%, higher than any other village in the suburbs. Majority of the natives are fluent in English and Urdu.

People
With most of the natives having families in Europe especially within the United Kingdom, Dhamyal town has a very high Human Development Index compared to most parts of Pakistan. Most of the natives are well educated and leaders in their fields. Some of the famous people include
 Professor Dr. Liaqat (A physicist at Jeddah University)
 Usman Latif (Principal Software Engineer at Rolls-Royce plc)
 Dr. Hassan Ali Khan (Research scientist at COMSATS )
In the past there were a lot of people in Army from the village and almost every family has a war veteran.

Climate
Dhamyal town is located right in the centre of the Potohar region and the climate is usually very warm. Even in the winter months, temperatures can be as high as 25° Celsius. During the summer months, especially June and July, temperatures can reach up to 50° Celsius regularly.

Amenities
Dhamyal town residents enjoy a host of amenities including accessible shopping centres, local bakery, fuel station and other essential items.

Sport
Cricket, volleyball and football are popular among the youth of the village. Since early 1980s cricket has been the dominant game in village with cricket grounds available throughout the year, most youths are playing it throughout the year.

References

Populated places in Jhelum District